The 1981 UTEP Miners football team was an American football team that represented the University of Texas at El Paso in the Western Athletic Conference during the 1981 NCAA Division I-A football season. After an 0–2 start to the season, fifth-year head coach Bill Michael was fired and replaced with assistant Billy Alton. The Miners then ended the season with one win and eight more losses and finished with an 1–10 record.

Schedule

References

UTEP
UTEP Miners football seasons
UTEP Miners football